Cartha RFC was a twentieth-century Glasgow-based rugby union club. The club merged with Queens Park F.P. to form Cartha Queens Park in 1974.

History

The rugby club grew out of a Cartha Athletic Club which started in 1889. The athletic club branched out into various sports among them:- football (1891), hockey (1890), cricket (1891) and tennis.

Formation of the rugby club

By 1906 a rugby club had formed. It was admitted to the SRU in 1908.

Ground

The club initially played its matches at Dumbreck.

Merger

The two southside clubs of Cartha RFC and Queens Park F.P. were struggling by the end of the 1973–74 season. Cartha was mid-table in the Division 5 West league; whilst Queens Park F.P. finished bottom with the fate of relegation hanging over them.

So for the following season 1974-75 the two clubs decided to merge to try and strengthen their position.

Cartha Sevens

The club began its own Sevens tournament in 1935, then known as the Cartha Sevens. It continued after the merger with Queens Park F.P. in 1974 as the Cartha Queens Park Sevens; it is now known as the Glasgow City Sevens.

Honours

 Helensburgh Sevens
 Champions (1) : 1974
 Kilmarnock Sevens
 Champions (1) : 1953

Notable former players

Scotland international players

The following former Cartha players went on to represent Scotland.

References

Rugby union in Glasgow
Scottish rugby union teams
Pollokshields
Defunct Scottish rugby union clubs
Rugby clubs established in 1906
Rugby union clubs disestablished in 1974
1906 establishments in Scotland
1974 disestablishments in Scotland